Jim Brown is a multihull sailboat designer who collaborates with John Marples.

The pair are responsible for the Constant camber, Seaclipper and Searunner series of trimarans.

Early in his career, Jim Brown was inspired by Arthur Piver. Jim is now retired.

See also 
 Arthur Piver
 Searunner 31
 Trimaran

References

External links 
 Searunner Multihulls

Multihull designers
Living people
Year of birth missing (living people)